The Spiegel Office Building is a historic office building at 1038 W. 35th Street in the Bridgeport neighborhood of Chicago, Illinois. It was built in 1936-37 as an office building for Spiegel Inc., a mail order company established in Chicago in 1865. The company built its new offices in the midst of a change in its goals and marketing, as it shifted from promoting its easy credit to offering higher-quality products to wealthier customers. The new office building allowed the company to consolidate several of its offices to improve efficiency and thus customer service. Engineers Battey & Kipp designed the Art Moderne style building, which had an industrial loft plan with open floors. In the 1940s, engineer Abraham Epstein placed an addition on the building, allowing the company to keep all of its offices in the building.

The building was added to the National Register of Historic Places on February 18, 2009.

References

Office buildings on the National Register of Historic Places in Illinois
Commercial buildings on the National Register of Historic Places in Chicago
Moderne architecture in Illinois
Office buildings completed in 1937